Alexander Huber (born 25 July 1985) is an Austrian beach volleyball player.

He competed at the 2016 Summer Olympics in Rio de Janeiro, Brazil in the men's beach volleyball tournament. At just 5"10, he is one of the smallest players at the World Tour.

References

External links
 
 
 
 

1985 births
Living people
Austrian beach volleyball players
Olympic beach volleyball players of Austria
Beach volleyball players at the 2016 Summer Olympics